Sir Henry Williams, 2nd Baronet (c. 1635 – February 1666) was a Welsh politician who sat in the House of Commons from 1660 to 1661.

He was one of the Williams baronets. He was a Member of Parliament and represented the constituencies of Brecon and Breconshire (c. Apr 1661 – election declared void 25 July 1661).

His daughter Elizabeth married Sir Edward Williams.

References

1635 births
1666 deaths
Baronets in the Baronetage of England
Members of the Parliament of England (pre-1707) for constituencies in Wales
English MPs 1660
English MPs 1661–1679